David William "Butch" White (14 December 1935 – 1 August 2008) was an English first-class cricketer, who played in two Test matches in 1961 and 1962. He played county cricket for Hampshire from 1957 to 1971, with a final season at Glamorgan in 1972.

Early life
White was born in Sutton Coldfield, Warwickshire. In his youth, he played club cricket for Aston Unity in the Birmingham League and for Warwickshire Second XI. During National Service as a driving instructor in the Army, he made his first-class debut for Hampshire, playing against Cambridge University in 1957, and joining the county staff in 1958. The retirement of Vic Cannings in 1959 gave him the opportunity to open the bowling for Hampshire alongside Derek Shackleton.

First-class cricket career
A pace bowler, White took 1,097 first-class wickets in 15 seasons with Hampshire. He helped Hampshire win the County Championship title for the first time in 1961 under captain Colin Ingleby-Mackenzie, with White and Shackleton each taking over 100 wickets. At the time, White was considered one of the best fast bowlers in England. Many Hampshire fans consider him the fastest English bowler to have played for the county.

He was a muscular bowler, running in energetically from 25 yards, with a convulsive delivery stride. He troubled batsmen for pace, and combined a natural in-swinger with a ball that held its line outside off stump. He was no-balled for throwing by Paul Gibb twice in 1960, but Gibb later recognised that he had been mistaken. His batting was limited, and tended to the agricultural. In 1960, he scored 28 off an over bowled by Oxford University off-spinner Dan Piachaud: after a dot ball, he hit four sixes and then a four.

He took over 100 wickets in a season on four occasions, claiming 6–10 at Middlesbrough in 1965 against a Yorkshire side (including Geoff Boycott, Brian Close, Ray Illingworth and Fred Trueman) that was bowled out for its lowest ever first-class total of 23. His best figures were 9–44 against Leicestershire at Portsmouth in 1966.

He played just two Tests, both on the 1961/62 tour of Pakistan and India captained by Ted Dexter. White's Test debut may have been delayed by early concerns at his bowling action, at a time when Geoff Griffin was causing controversy; competition from Brian Statham and Fred Trueman kept him out of the Test side during his best years. He opened the bowling in the First Test at Lahore in October 1961, England's first Test in Pakistan, dismissing the Pakistani opening batsmen, Hanif Mohammed and Imtiaz Ahmed, within 16 balls, and ending the innings with 3–65. He also played in the final Test of the tour at Karachi in February 1962. He bowled Imtiaz Ahmed with his first ball, but pulled a muscle and was unable to continue after only 16 deliveries. Although he suffered from a series of injuries on the tour, he topped the tourists' bowling averages, with 32 wickets at 19.84.

His benefit in 1969 raised £4,547. Persistent injury spoiled his season in 1971, and he was dropped from the team. He had a brief spell with Glamorgan in 1972, playing in one county match and several limited-over fixtures.

Later life
After retiring from the first-class game, he settled in Sussex and was a coach at Christ's Hospital in Horsham. He also played for New Milton in the Hampshire League, and made frequent appearances at Arundel Castle cricket ground playing for the Duchess of Norfolk's XI, amongst many others.

He was married twice, and had one son.

A keen golfer, he was engaged as a marshal at Mannings Heath GC, but treasured his membership at West Sussex Golf Club in Pulborough, where he was a popular member and enthusiastic competitor in all club competitions. He died after suffering a heart attack on the golf course at Pulborough, West Sussex.

References

 Obituary, The Daily Telegraph, 5 August 2008
 Obituary, The Times, 7 August 2008
 Obituary, The Independent, 14 August 2008
 Obituary, The Guardian, 19 August 2008
 Cricket Archive
 Cricinfo

1935 births
2008 deaths
Cricketers from Sutton Coldfield
England Test cricketers
English cricketers
Glamorgan cricketers
Hampshire cricketers
International Cavaliers cricketers
Marylebone Cricket Club cricketers
T. N. Pearce's XI cricketers